The 92nd Battalion (48th Highlanders), CEF, was an infantry battalion of the Great War Canadian Expeditionary Force. The 92nd Battalion was authorized on 30 July 1915 and embarked for Britain on 20 May 1916 where the battalion provided reinforcements to the Canadian Corps in the field until 24 January 1917, when its personnel were absorbed by the 5th Reserve Battalion, CEF. The battalion disbanded on 1 September 1917.

The 92nd Battalion recruited in, and was mobilized at, Toronto, Ontario.

The 92nd Battalion was commanded by Lt.-Col. G.T. Chisholm from 20 May 1916 to 4 January 1917.

The 92nd Battalion was awarded the battle honour THE GREAT WAR 1916-17.

The 92nd Battalion (48th Highlanders), CEF is perpetuated by the 48th Highlanders of Canada.

References

Sources
Canadian Expeditionary Force 1914–1919 by Col. G. W. L. Nicholson, CD, Queen's Printer, Ottawa, Ontario, 1962

092
Military units and formations of Ontario
48th Highlanders of Canada